Elizabeth Keifer (born November 14, 1961) is an American actress.

Keifer was born in Pacific Palisades, California. She played the role of Christina "Blake" Marler on Guiding Light from August 1992 until the program ended in September 2009. In addition to her portrayal of Blake, Keifer has also appeared on other soaps, including, The Young and the Restless, One Life to Live, Days of Our Lives, and General Hospital.

Married to Robert Convertino since 1996, Keifer is the mother of two children: a daughter, Isabella and a son, Keifer.

Filmography

Video games

References

 CBS Daytime Bio

External links
 

1961 births
20th-century American actresses
21st-century American actresses
Actresses from California
American soap opera actresses
American television actresses
Living people